The extracellular polysaccharide colanic acid is produced by species of the family Enterobacteriaceae. In Escherichia coli strain K12 the colanic acid cluster comprises 19 genes. The wzx gene encodes a protein with multiple transmembrane segments that may function in export of the colanic acid repeat unit from the cytoplasm into the periplasm in a process analogous to O-unit export. The colanic acid gene clusters may be involved in the export of polysaccharide from the cell.

References

Outer membrane proteins
Protein families